The Latest is the sixteenth studio album by the American hard rock and power pop band Cheap Trick, released on June 23, 2009. The album was produced by Cheap Trick, Julian Raymond, and Howard Willing and was issued on CD, as well as limited pressings on vinyl and 8-track tape. The Latest is the final studio album by the band to feature original drummer Bun E. Carlos who left the band in 2010.

Background 
The track "Sleep Forever" was written in memory of a friend who died, "Miss Tomorrow" was originally a B-side from Robin Zander's eponymous 1993 solo album, taken from the "Show Me Heaven" single, while "Sick Man of Europe" was one of the band names used by Nielsen and Petersson in the early 1970s. "Everyday You Make Me Crazy" was originally written by the band as a Pepsi jingle from 1995 while "Alive" is a re-worked version of "What's in It for You", an outtake from the band's previous 2006 album Rockford.

Two music videos were created for songs off the album: one for "When the Lights Are Out" which was released on January 18, 2009, and one for "Sick Man of Europe", which was released on August 13, 2009.

Reception
The Latest debuted at number 78 on Billboard 200, and number 36 on the Top Rock Albums. The album has sold 24,000 copies in the United States as of March 2016.

Track listing

Personnel

Cheap Trick
 Robin Zander – lead vocals, rhythm guitar
 Rick Nielsen – lead guitar, background vocals
 Tom Petersson – bass, background vocals
 Bun E. Carlos – drums

Additional musicians
 Julian Raymond – arrangements, additional musician
 Roger Joseph Manning Jr – keyboards
 Bon Harris – programming
 George Doering – acoustic guitar
 Luis Conte – programming
 Bennett Salvay – orchestration
 Jason Falkner – additional musician
 Todd Youth – additional musician
Linus of Hollywood – additional musician

Charts

References

Cheap Trick albums
2009 albums
Albums produced by Julian Raymond